Marija Naumova-Bullīta (born 23 June 1973), known professionally as Marija Naumova, is a Latvian singer of Russian descent. Under the stage name Marie N, she sings a broad range of music ranging from pop to musical theatre and jazz, and has recorded several albums, with songs in Latvian, French, English, Russian and Portuguese. In 2002, she won the Eurovision Song Contest for Latvia with her song "I Wanna".

Biography 
Naumova was discovered by famous Latvian musician Raimonds Pauls in 1994 and after a year she performed on TV in searches for talent. She never won, but was noticed by the audience.

In 1998, she performed in a concert celebrating the 100 years jubilee of George Gershwin. In March 1998 she performed on stage in concerts with famous Latvian musicians, and one of those concerts was recorded on CD. That gave her career a boost and she began to participate in several music events, television and radio shows, and give interviews for Latvian newspapers.

Naumova's first solo album, which was completely in Russian, was released in 1999. In 2000 Latvia participated in the Eurovision Song Contest for the first time. Naumova was in the national finals but came second behind Brainstorm. In 2001, she again participated in the Latvian preselection, singing "Hey Boy Follow Me", which was voted public favourite but was not chosen by the expert jury. Naumova had to wait another year before she was finally chosen to represent Latvia with "I Wanna", for which she also wrote the music and co-wrote the lyrics.

In the Eurovision Song Contest 2002, her performance of "I Wanna" won the competition and gave Latvia its first ever Eurovision win.

According to author and historian John Kennedy O'Connor in his book The Eurovision Song Contest – The Official History, despite its success at the contest, "I Wanna" gained the dubious distinction of being the first Eurovision winner that was not released outside of its own territory. Even in Latvia the single never reached the top 30.

In November of her victory year she recorded two new solo albums: one in English, and one in Latvian. She presented the albums to the audience with a tour throughout Latvia.

Naumova co-hosted the Eurovision Song Contest 2003 along with Renars Kaupers of the Latvian band Brainstorm, who came 3rd in the contest in 2000.

In 2004, Naumova successfully combined her singing and acting talents in the lead role of The Sound of Music.

In December Marie N's latest album "On My Own" was released, with songs in Latvian, French, English and Portuguese. New compositions for Marie N are composed by Sergey Manoukyan, Ivar Must and Andrejs Jevsjukovs. Marie N has written several songs herself, as well. There are cover versions of several world-famous songs in the album – for example, two compositions which were originally written in French, but became very popular in English language.

Naumova has a law degree from the University of Latvia. In 2005, she was chosen as the UNICEF goodwill envoy to Latvia.

As of 2012, Naumova was on a musical hiatus to concentrate on her personal life, returning in 2016 with the album Uz Ilūziju Tilta.

, Naumova was living in France with her family, but still traveled back and forth to Latvia.

Discography

Albums 
 1998: До светлых слёз
 2000: Ieskaties acīs
 2001: Ma Voix, Ma Voie (LV:Gold certification)
 2002: On A Journey
 2002: Noslēpumi
 2004: Nesauciet sev līdzi
 2005: Another Dream
 2010: Lullabies
 2016: Uz Ilūziju Tilta

See also 
 List of Eurovision Song Contest presenters

References

External links 
 Official Website

1973 births
Living people
Eurovision Song Contest entrants of 2002
Eurovision Song Contest winners
Eurovision Song Contest entrants for Latvia
Latvian people of Russian descent
Musicians from Riga
University of Latvia alumni
21st-century Latvian women singers